Thomas Jung is an American art director, graphic designer, illustrator, and storyboard artist. He is known for his movie poster art.

Biography

Early life and career
Jung, a Chinese American, was raised and educated in Boston, Massachusetts. After finishing high school, he attended the School of the Museum of Fine Arts. During his second year he was drafted into the Army. While stationed at Fort Jackson in Columbia, South Carolina, Jung contributed to the newspaper Fort Jackson Leader as an editorial cartoonist, designing and illustrating primarily public service communications.

Following his discharge, he worked as a freelance illustrator and art director with a number of well known advertising agencies in New York.

In 1958 Jung was hired full-time to redesign advertisement campaigns of foreign films to suit American audiences (theatrical redistribution) for Ben Adler Advertising Services Inc. Jung created pressbooks (exhibitor's campaign manuals) and one sheets for distribution to independently owned movie theaters throughout the country, including La Strada and And God Created Woman.

Jung's early work is typified by caricature art for movies such as Confessions of Felix Krull, The Captain from Köpenick, The Golden Age of Comedy and Murder Ahoy. His one-sheet art for the film School for Scoundrels is perhaps the best example of that early style, displaying caricatures in shades of black and gray on a white background with distinctive handlettering. The look recalls Jung's own early aspirations of becoming a Mad Magazine cartoonist in the style of such artists as Jack Davis, Mort Drucker and Jack Rickard.

Jung's early successes led eventually to his role as freelance art director in 1963 at Metro-Goldwyn-Mayer, where he designed posters for roadshow or "hard-ticket" movies such as Dr. Zhivago, Grand Prix, Far from the Madding Crowd, Ice Station Zebra, and The Shoes of the Fisherman. The design process at MGM involved developing multiple poster concepts, carefully rendered in pencil or charcoal with or without copy lines and credits in position. These "layouts" were then presented to and scrutinized by ad manager Bill O'Hare and marketing vice president Dan Terrell for approval as the films' key art. Once selected, this concept would be the one to appear in newspapers, magazines and in-house stationery, PR communications, all interior and outdoor posting material for distribution in the United States.

Upon final review by MGM chief executive officer Robert O'Brien, the concept was turned over to their advertising agency account executive, Lloyd McKean, to manage implementation. Art Director Burt Kleeger would task the agreed-upon illustrator to prepare a full color painting of the approved image as well as to design various needed parts of the campaign. The advertising agency art department would then prepare "mechanicals" to precise dimensions for the engravers and plate makers for newspaper, magazine and poster printers.

Jung selected Howard Terpning to illustrate his concept art for the 1967 re-release of Gone with the Wind. Taking a cue from the original movie poster art, Jung's iconic pose is often imitated, most notably in the style A poster for The Empire Strikes Back. "I see the results of my design all over," he said. "Gone with the Wind was really notable for its schmaltziness."

In 1968, Jung was engaged by Bill O'Hare, now a marketing executive at CBS television network's theatrical film division Cinema Center Films, to handle the art direction for their entire release schedule of nearly 30 films. Some of the films Jung designed and illustrated, with the help of able staffer and artist Vincent Marrone, were A Man Called Horse, Little Big Man, Prime Cut, and Le Mans, starring Steve McQueen.

Later career
In 1973, Jung's work on the movie Papillon "was the first major break that pushed him into the big-bracket category". "It was obvious that Dustin Hoffman and Steve McQueen had unique roles in Papillon," he recalled. "Steve represented, at that time, a gut of defiance that any person would identify with ... defiance against oppression and authority. The poster made with this theme merged perfectly with the mood of the film." An auction profile for the original art gives a synopsis of Jung's concept: "Accomplished in acrylic on a leaf of 17 x 18 ¼ in. artist's illustration board it features the defiant, squinting profiles of Steve McQueen and Dustin Hoffman. Jung commented that although he was a trained illustrator, for 20 years he had acted as art director for ad campaigns and concepts, and not practicing his painting. The present concept study was his first effort to establish a style and was approved by Marketing VP Ed Seigenfeld (Allied Artists, 1973)."

During this time Jung was known to film studios as a one stop shop for advertising. He was handed a project and given full discretion to develop the concept, design and illustration including copy lines and title logos. Jung worked for Allied Artists, United Artists, Columbia Pictures, 20th Century Fox, Paramount Pictures and Lucasfilm Ltd. designing key art concepts and illustrating movie posters for films including The Man Who Would Be King, The Deer Hunter, Dr. Zhivago, and Apocalypse Now.

Jung often collaborated with Nelson Lyon, a former Saturday Night Live writer and the creator of the 1971 movie The Telephone Book, to develop copy lines. Jung's unique title logos for movies such as The Sand Pebbles, Super Fly, Gold and The Omen tie-in key elements that distill down the essence of the films into key art.

As a freelance illustrator in 1977 working for the motion picture advertising boutique of Smolen, Smith and Connolly, Jung was chosen to work on Star Wars. He was given the theme of "Good Over Evil," and provided with a wealth of photos taken by unit photographers in color and black & white, as well as 2.25-inch stills on contact sheets taken from the original 35mm print of the film. Jung's work was used as the one sheet "style A" theatrical poster for the film's advertising campaign. According to Jung, the unlikely "cross" formed by Luke Skywalker's saber sword set against the ghosted background image of Darth Vader seemed to him like a good solution to the "good" versus "evil" theme. The poster also featured a notable title logo from Jung, mimicking the film's famed opening crawl.

A stylistic progression in Jung's art is clear from his 1978 work on The Lord of the Rings. One of two concepts submitted, the one sheet depicting Gandalf and the Hobbits Frodo and Sam is rendered in a style markedly different from Jung's other works. In his own words: "There's probably a lot of posters I've done that people aren't aware of: Papillon, The Man Who Would Be King, and ... for Lord of the Rings." Jung's poster won first prize for Best Graphic Award in 1978 from the International Society of Science Fiction, Horror and Fantasy, and has been called "truly the most well-remembered image" from the film.

Regarding his 1980 work on The Empire Strikes Back, Jung recalled: "I used various martial arts attitudes in my working studies, trying to come up with the perfect look. I was searching for the image 'bi-coastal' (as they used to say) of Darth Vader, which could be the centerpiece for The Empire Strikes Back. I made the presentation to Sid Ganis at Lucasfilm's new offices in North Hollywood, near Universal Studios. In the large airy reception area sitting on couches, with my presentation spread on a coffee table, we attracted a small crowd of onlookers. Steven Spielberg peered in and chimed, 'I like that' and strolled away. It was the drawing of Darth Vader in profile, a powerful outstretched arm holding his saber."

In 1981 Jung was contacted by Sid Ganis, vice president of marketing at Lucasfilm, to develop concept sketches for Raiders of the Lost Ark. At the same time the production company, Paramount Pictures along with advertising agency Diener/Hauser/Bates, were working with another illustrator, Richard Amsel, to also develop a marketing campaign. Jung created sixteen concept sketches for the one-sheet, one of which was approved to go to color. Borrowing from his original Papillon artwork, Jung used a "brown sauce" palette and a unique concept to create the iconic character Indiana Jones for his interpretation of the movie's key art.

After many months of back and forth between competing concepts it was decided that Richard Amsel's would be used as the one-sheet for the campaign. The decision was partly based on the view that the character Indiana Jones should not be shown with a gun. In Jung's art, a gun and a whip were both prominently held by Indiana Jones. Jung's concept, though not used during the film's advertising campaign, is preserved in the Lucasfilm archives.

Starting in 1997 with the Disney film Jungle 2 Jungle, Jung began working on the production side of the business as a storyboard artist. His ability to draw without the use of visual aids, in a manner similar to that of a comic book artist, made his transition to storyboard art unproblematic. Jung's films as a storyboard artist include The Perfect Storm, The Salton Sea, and Disturbia.

Creative process
An interview on the design and illustration of the 1974 poster The Man with the Golden Gun, Jung elaborated on his creative process: "The actual painting is done on 20x30 double-weight illustration board, half of a standard 30×40 board. I used acrylics, I can use it transparently or opaquely; it dries quickly and is permanent and can be reworked. I'd use airbrushing for large areas of background, color pencils, and inks and dyes and tempera and whatever else I think that may give me the desired result. Sandpaper. Brillo. A single-edge razor blade. Whatever works." Jung often used family members as models. For the Star Wars poster design, with Frank Frazetta in mind as his final illustrator, Jung posed his son Jeff as Luke Skywalker and his wife Kay as Princess Leia. After discussions with Don Smolen of Smolen, Smith and Connolly, it was decided that Jung would execute the illustration.

Jung has said he believes he does not have a recognizable technique: "I adjust my technique to the problem at hand, because being an art director in advertising it's really the end result that I'm after ... anything to get the printed poster and the printed ad, which is the primary goal".

Select illustrations and graphic design

Select storyboard artwork

Awards
 The International Society of Science Fiction, Horror and Fantasy, "Best Graphic Award", 1979, Lord of the Rings
 Key Art Award, Tom Jung, designer, illustrator, "El Francotirador": (The Deer Hunter) Latin America, Third Place, 1980
 Key Art Award, Creating and illustrating The Golden Years of Country, 1978

See also

 List of Star Wars artists
 Richard Amsel
 Saul Bass
 Tom Chantrell
 Jack Davis
 Frank Frazetta
 The Brothers Hildebrandt
 Frank McCarthy
 Bob Peak
 Drew Struzan
 Howard Terpning

References

Interviews
 Visiting artist draws the movies by David Prabu, Athens NEWS contributor - courtesy of Daniel Saez, Athens (Ohio) News - Spring 1987
 Exclusive with Tom Jung - "The Man with the Golden Gun", Illustrated 007 Peter Lorenz
 Sketching out the action, he loves making a scene - Los Angeles Times, Susan King - May 20, 2007
 Rebelscum.com forum, darthlumber ID, January 30, 2010
 Artistic License, a look at the marketing campaign for "Licence Revoked" - MI6 Confidential, Issue #26 - August 2014

External links
 The Academy of Motion Picture Arts and Sciences, Margaret Herrick Library Catalog, Tom Jung
 The Academy of Motion Picture Arts and Sciences, Margaret Herrick Library Catalog, Tom Jung Papers
 The Academy of Motion Picture Arts and Sciences, Margaret Herrick Library Manuscript Inventories, Tom Jung
 The Academy of Motion Picture Arts and Sciences, Margaret Herrick Library Production Art Database, Tom Jung
 Preliminary design, Star Wars, Sciencefictionarchives.com
 Preliminary design, The Empire Strikes Back, Sciencefictionarchives.com
 Preliminary design, Return of the Jedi, Sciencefictionarchives.com
 Movieposterdb.com—Select listing of Tom Jung's art
 IMPawards—Select listing of Tom Jung's art
 

Living people
American graphic designers
American storyboard artists
American illustrators
American artists of Chinese descent
Artists from Boston
Film poster artists
American caricaturists
American poster artists
Science fiction artists
Tolkien artists
Year of birth missing (living people)